Nguyễn Minh Đức (born 14 September 1983) is a Vietnamese footballer who plays for Sông Lam Nghệ An.

Honors

With Sài Gòn 
 2011 Vietnamese First Division: Winner

With Vietnam national football team 
 2008 AFF Suzuki Cup: Winner
 2010 AFF Suzuki Cup:
 2012 AFF Suzuki Cup: Captain.

Individual
 ASEAN Football Federation Best XI: 2013

References

External links

1985 births
Living people
People from Nghệ An province
Vietnamese footballers
Association football defenders
Vietnam international footballers
Song Lam Nghe An FC players
Haiphong FC players
V.League 1 players
Xuan Thanh Saigon Cement FC players
Footballers at the 2006 Asian Games
Footballers at the 2010 Asian Games
Asian Games competitors for Vietnam